The year 2011 in Archosaur paleontology was eventful.  Archosaurs include the only living dinosaur group — birds — and the reptile crocodilians, plus all extinct dinosaurs,  extinct crocodilian relatives, and pterosaurs. Archosaur palaeontology is the scientific study of those animals, especially as they existed before the Holocene Epoch began about 11,700 years ago.  The year 2011 in paleontology included various significant developments regarding archosaurs.

This article records new taxa of fossil archosaurs of every kind that have been described during the year 2011, as well as other significant discoveries and events related to paleontology of archosaurs that occurred in the year 2011.

Newly named crurotarsans

Newly named non-avian dinosaurs

Newly named birds

Newly named pterosaurs

Notes

References 

2011 in paleontology